Anke Huber won in the final 6–3, 6–0 against Karina Habšudová.

Seeds
A champion seed is indicated in bold text while text in italics indicates the round in which that seed was eliminated.

  Anke Huber (champion)
  Amanda Coetzer (first round)
  Barbara Paulus (semifinals)
  Julie Halard-Decugis (first round)
  Karina Habšudová (final)
  Judith Wiesner (second round)
  Sabine Appelmans (quarterfinals)
  Nathalie Tauziat (second round)

Draw

External links
 ITF tournament edition details
 Tournament draws

1996 WTA Tour
Luxembourg Open
1996 in Luxembourgian tennis